Oedaspis ouinensis is a species of tephritid or fruit flies in the genus Oedaspis of the family Tephritidae.

Distribution
New Caledonia.

References

Tephritinae
Insects described in 2008
Diptera of Australasia